The Pakistan cricket team toured Sri Lanka from 11 June to 1 August 2015. The tour consisted of a three-day tour match against a SLCB President's XI, three Test matches, five One Day International and two Twenty20 International matches. The third Test was originally scheduled to be played at the R Premadasa Stadium, but was changed to the Pallekele International Cricket Stadium in early May.

Pakistan outplayed the hosts in all forms of the game by winning the Test series 2–1, the ODI series 3–2 and the T20I series 2–0.

Squads

Pakistan bowler Wahab Riaz injured his hand during the first day of the second Test and was ruled out of the rest of the series. Riaz was originally named in the T20I squad, but was replaced by Zia-ul-Haq as his injury did not fully heal. Sri Lankan batsman Upul Tharanga replaced Kumar Sangakkara for the third Test due to Sangakkara's commitments with Surrey. On 2 July Sri Lankan bowler Dushmantha Chameera was ruled out of the third Test due to injury and was replaced by Lahiru Gamage. Lahiru Gamage replaced injured Nuwan Pradeep in the fifth ODI.

Tour Match

SLCB President's XI vs Pakistanis

Test series

1st Test

2nd Test

3rd Test

ODI series

1st ODI

2nd ODI

3rd ODI

4th ODI

5th ODI

T20I series

1st T20I

2nd T20I

References

External links
 Series home on ESPN Cricinfo

2015 in Pakistani cricket
2015 in Sri Lankan cricket
International cricket competitions in 2015
Pakistani cricket tours of Sri Lanka